The Florida State–Miami football rivalry is an American college football rivalry between the Florida State Seminoles football team of Florida State University and Miami Hurricanes football team of the University of Miami. Since the late 1980s, one or both squads have been highly ranked entering the game, adding national championship implications to an already heated rivalry. Kicks have played an important role in the series with many wide right, wide left, blocks and other mistakes occurring with the game in the balance. Miami leads the series 35-32 through the 2022 season.

The series has consistently drawn very high television ratings with the 2006 game being the most-watched college football game—regular-season or postseason—in ESPN history, and the 2009 and 1994 meetings being the second- and fifth-most watched regular season games, respectively.

Notable games

1963: Seminoles Stun Mira and Gus' Dream Team
In one of the season's biggest shockers, FSU stunned Miami 24–0, in the season opener for both squads. Miami quarterback, George Mira, had been the cover boy for Sports Illustrated's 1963 college football preseason preview. Miami head coach Andy Gustafson, who had been named athletic director in the spring, put off retirement for a year to coach what most pro scouts believed was the best quarterback in all of college football.  On this night, however, Steve Tensi and Fred Biletnikoff were the stars and Florida State made its first real appearance on the national stage. This win marked the first of seven straight wins by the Seminoles and the longest winning streak in the series. All of the Seminoles' wins came on Miami's home turf, the Orange Bowl.

1987: Going for the win
FSU and Miami played an epic game in 1987. This game had more future NFL players on the field than any game played in CFB history. Both teams were ranked in the top 4. FSU jumped out to a 19–3 lead. FSU led until Miami came back in the 4th quarter to take a 26–19 lead. FSU scored a touchdown with 42 seconds left. FSU could tie with the extra point, but Bowden decided to go for the win. The pass was broken up and the Noles lost 26–25 to the Canes. Miami would go on to win the program's second national championship.

1989: FSU Beats the National Champions
Florida State beat Miami 24–10 as Miami was missing their starting QB and was forced to play freshman Gino Toretta (Gino went on to win the National Championship in '91 & Heisman trophy in '92). However, Miami's defense was the strength of the team having given up an average of only eight points a game in the six games Miami played before facing FSU, so Toretta was not the reason FSU's offense scored 24 points on their defense. Miami went on to win the National Championship upon Craig Erickson's return. FSU did not compete for it, as they suffered two losses at the beginning of the season to a Brett Favre led Southern Miss and Clemson.

Prior to the game, University of Miami mascot Sebastian the Ibis was tackled by a group of police officers for attempting to put out Chief Osceola's flaming spear. Sebastian was wearing a fireman’s helmet and yellow raincoat and holding a fire extinguisher. When a police officer attempted to grab the fire extinguisher, the officer was sprayed in the chest. Sebastian was handcuffed by four officers but ultimately released. Miami quarterback Gino Torretta, who started the game in place of injured Craig Erickson, told ESPN, "Even if we weren't bad boys, it added to the mystique that, 'Man, look, even their mascot's getting arrested.'"

1991: Wide Right I

After being called a "key persona" by Keith Jackson for hitting his third field goal of the game, Florida State kicker Gerry Thomas missed a field goal to the right with less than a minute left, and the top-ranked Seminoles lost in Tallahassee to the second-ranked Hurricanes, 17–16. Miami went on to split the national championship with the University of Washington, and Florida State finished the season 11–2, ending it by winning the Cotton Bowl Classic against Texas A&M University.

1992: Wide Right II

Seminole placekicker Dan Mowrey missed a field goal to the right, and the 1992 Seminoles lost to the Hurricanes in Miami, 19–16. Miami took an undefeated record to the Sugar Bowl, but lost the national championship to Alabama Crimson Tide. Florida State did not lose again, and finished the season ranked second, after Alabama, in both major polls.

2000: Wide Right III
Miami took a 27–24 lead after a Ken Dorsey touchdown pass to Jeremy Shockey, but Seminole quarterback and 2000 Heisman Trophy winner Chris Weinke moved the Seminoles into field goal range during a last minute drive in Miami's Orange Bowl stadium. Florida State kicker Matt Munyon missed a field goal attempt again to the right to seal the Hurricanes' victory. Controversy erupted later in the season when the Seminoles were ranked higher by the BCS and picked to play in the Orange Bowl against Oklahoma for the national championship despite Miami being ranked higher in both the AP Poll and Coaches Poll. The Seminoles lost to the Sooners 13–2, while the Hurricanes defeated Florida 37–20 in the Sugar Bowl. Miami would finish #2 in the polls that year.

2002: Wide Left I
The defending champion Hurricanes staged a comeback against the underdog Seminoles to take a 28–27 lead with only minutes left in the game in Miami. The Seminoles drove down the field to give kicker Xavier Beitia a chance to win the game with a last second field goal. Beitia missed the kick to the left, giving Miami the victory. FSU went on to win the Atlantic Coast Conference title with a 9–5 overall record, but lost in the Sugar Bowl to Georgia. Miami would finish the regular season undefeated and then lose in the national championship game, the 2003 Fiesta Bowl, to Ohio State.

2004: Orange Bowl: Wide Right IV

This contest, a rematch of the regular season game won by Miami, took place in the 2004 Orange Bowl. In this contest, Beitia missed a field goal—wide right—that could have given the Seminoles the lead with about 5 minutes left. This game was of lesser importance on a national scale compared to the other Wide Right games, but continued the streak of Florida State losses determined by a single kick. With the win, Miami would finish #5 in the polls that year. It also marked the fourth loss in a streak that ultimately became the first time in NCAA History a Quarterback had lost 5 times to the same team, as FSU Quarterback Chris Rix had started and played in all 5 losses going between October, 2001, and September, 2004. This second win for Miami over Florida State that season made the Hurricanes the only team to ever beat the Seminoles twice in the same academic year. They are also the only team to beat the Seminoles in back-to-back games (this Orange Bowl was the final game of the season for both teams, who then opened against one another in Miami the following season). It was the only bowl meeting between the rivals, as Miami's move to the ACC the next season would make the schools intra-conference rivals and reduce the possibility of the teams ever meeting in a bowl game again.

2005: The Miami Muff
Miami was ranked No. 9 and FSU No. 14 in what proved to be a defensive struggle. Trailing 10–7, and with one last chance to tie the score to extend it into overtime, the Hurricanes drove down the field to set up a game-tying field goal with 2:16 left. When the ball was snapped, it was mishandled by holder Brian Monroe and the ball never reached the kicker's foot. It would be the Hurricanes' turn to suffer a defeat at the hands of a kicking team mistake. The Seminoles kept the ball for remaining two minutes and finally ended their six-game losing streak against the Hurricanes and gained their first victory in the rivalry since 1999.

2006: Last meetup at the Orange Bowl
Florida State played their season opener against the rival University of Miami Hurricanes on Labor Day for the third straight year. It was also the third time the team opened their Atlantic Coast Conference play with Miami. Much like the previous two Labor Day meetings, the 2006 edition of the game was a defensive struggle for both teams. The Seminoles trailed 10–3 at the half, but held Miami scoreless in the third and fourth quarters and took the lead with a 33-yard field goal late in the game. The 'Noles preserved the win when cornerback Michael Ray Garvin intercepted Miami quarterback Kyle Wright's pass with 29 seconds remaining. This would be the last meeting at the Miami Orange Bowl as the Hurricanes would move to Sun Life Stadium following the 2007 season. FSU would finish with a 15–16 record in 31 games against UM at the Orange Bowl stadium.

2016: The Block at the Rock 
Miami came into the game unbeaten and ranked 10th in the country, with a chance to move up in the top 10 after critical losses earlier in the day. Florida State came in ranked 23rd. The Hurricanes were looking to make a return to national prominence after recovering from the Nevin Shapiro scandal, in addition to snapping a six-game losing streak to Florida State. In the first half, Miami led 13–0 early. Florida State cut that lead to 13–3 with a field goal before the end of the 2nd quarter. Miami struggled out of the gate in the second half, as Hurricanes quarterback Brad Kaaya drove Miami down the field, but threw an interception in the end zone. Florida State scored on their next three possessions to take a 20–13 lead. Kaaya led the team down the field once again, and Miami scored on an 11-yard touchdown reception by Stacey Coley with 1:38 left. However, defensive end DeMarcus Walker blocked the extra point. Even though they were losing 20–19, Miami eschewed an onside kick attempt because they still had three timeouts left. After returning Miami's kickoff back to their own 13-yard line, Florida State was able to run out the clock by getting two first downs, and secured the one-point victory.

2017: The Rally in Tally
Miami entered the October 7 match-up in Tallahassee undefeated at 3–0; FSU entered 1–2, with a loss to future National Champions Alabama, a close loss at NC State, and a win against Wake Forest. The Canes, who hadn't beaten FSU since 2009, entered halftime trailing by three. Behind heroics from senior wide receiver Braxton Berrios, who finished with eight receptions for 90 yards and two touchdowns, the Canes led the Seminoles 17–13 with only 5:09 remaining. FSU, led by true freshman backup quarterback, James Blackman, drove into Miami territory and scored what seemed to be the game-winner via a 20-yard touchdown reception from junior wide receiver Auden Tate with 1:24 remaining. Miami quarterback Malik Rosier, though, methodically drove the Canes downfield and lobbed a 23-yard touchdown to senior wide receiver Darrell Langham, who made a back-shoulder catch and lunged past the pylon with :06 remaining. The scoring play, following a five-minute review, stood. This game would end Miami's seven-year run of futility vs. FSU and against coach Jimbo Fisher.

2018: The Comeback/Wide Left II
Florida State came into the game as 14-point underdogs against Miami. After two TD passes to tight end receiver Keith Gavin and wide receiver Tammorrion Terry, with two field-goal kicks from the foot of Ricky Aguayo, the Seminoles finished the first half leading 20–7 over the Hurricanes. Florida State extended the lead in the 2nd half as wide receiver D.J. Matthews executed a 74-yard punt return for a touchdown, putting the Noles in front 27–7 over the Canes. Miami's defense then caused two turnovers followed up with two touchdown passes by freshman quarterback N'Kosi Perry to cut the score to 27–21. With 11:52 left in the 4th Quarter, Perry threw a pass to receiver Brevin Jordan for a touchdown, taking a 28–27 lead over FSU, erasing a 20-point deficit and claiming victory after a wide left field goal attempt by Aguayo. This game would mark Miami's first win at home against Florida State since 2004, and the first time Miami has beaten Florida State in back-to-back years since the 2003 and 2004 seasons.

2021: “4th and 14” 

The season was not spectacular for either team, with Florida State coming in 3–6 after starting 0–4 and Miami at 5–4 after starting the year ranked #14. Florida State was playing for bowl eligibility, while Miami was seeking to maintain a four-game win streak in the rivalry.

The Seminoles came out hot, scoring 14 points and forcing three turnovers in the first quarter before taking a 20–7 lead into halftime. Miami would storm back with 21 unanswered points, taking a 28–20 lead with 11 minutes left. After a lengthy drive that resulted in a field goal by the Seminoles and an excellent defensive stop led by defensive end Jermaine Johnson II, the Seminoles had the ball with 2:09 left in the game down 28–23. After a 59 yard bomb caught by wide receiver Ja’Khi Douglas, the Florida State offense sputtered out to a 4th and 14 at the Miami 25 yard line. Florida State quarterback Jordan Travis would convert on a pass to wide receiver Andrew Parchment to the Miami 1 yard line before Travis would run it in himself on both a touchdown and the 2-point conversion to make it 31–28 with 26 seconds left. Miami’s push to tie the game was stopped short when refs ruled the game over after an attempted spike by Miami QB Tyler Van Dyke with less than three seconds left, the minimum time needed according to NCAA rules. The Noles celebrated their first win over the Hurricanes in four seasons and maintained their quest for bowl eligibility.

Accomplishments

Game results

See also  

 List of NCAA college football rivalry games

References 

College football rivalries in the United States
Florida State Seminoles football
Miami Hurricanes football
1951 establishments in Florida
Sports rivalries in Florida